This is a list of players who played at least one game for the Hartford Whalers (1979–80 to 1996–97) of the National Hockey League (NHL). For a list of players who played for the Whalers in the World Hockey Association, see List of New England Whalers players.


Key
  Current NHL player.
  Hockey Hall of Famer, or retired number.

Skaters

Goaltenders

See also
List of NHL players

References
NHL Whalers on Hockeydb

Hartford Whalers
players